Bilateral foreign relations between the two countries, Argentina and Malaysia, have existed for decades. Argentina has an embassy in Kuala Lumpur, and Malaysia has an embassy in Buenos Aires.

History 
Argentina established diplomatic relations with Malaysia on 7 June 1967, four years after the formation of the Federation of Malaysia and the first Argentine embassy was opened in Kuala Lumpur in August 1983. While, Malaysia opened its embassy in Buenos Aires in 1989.

Economic relations 
Malaysia is the 33rd main market and the 8th main Asian customer for Argentina after China, Japan, India, South Korea, Thailand, United Arab Emirates and Israel. In 2002, Argentine exports to Malaysia worth around $218 million and Malaysian exports total around $43 million. The main Argentine products exported to Malaysia are mostly agricultural and industrial products while Malaysian exports to Argentina in the classification of capital and intermediate goods. An agreement on the exemption of taxes on ships and aircraft operating in the international traffic has been signed between the two countries and takes into effect in 1997.

Further reading 
  Guia De Negocios De Malasia Argentina Trade Net

References 

 
Malaysia
Bilateral relations of Malaysia